Lina Mpele Ngwanzo (born 10 September 1992), known as Lina Mpele, is a DR Congolese footballer who plays as a defender for Equatoguinean club Malabo Kings FC and the DR Congo women's national team.

International career
Mpele capped for the DR Congo at senior level during the 2012 African Women's Championship.

See also
 List of Democratic Republic of the Congo women's international footballers

References

External links

1992 births
Living people
Democratic Republic of the Congo women's footballers
Women's association football defenders
Democratic Republic of the Congo women's international footballers
Democratic Republic of the Congo expatriate footballers
Democratic Republic of the Congo expatriates in Equatorial Guinea
Expatriate women's footballers in Equatorial Guinea
21st-century Democratic Republic of the Congo people